The Central District of Ramhormoz County is a district (bakhsh) in Ramhormoz County, Khuzestan Province, Iran. At the 2006 census, its population was 97,561, in 20,648 families.  The district has one city: Ramhormoz.  The district has four rural districts (dehestan): Abolfares Rural District, Howmeh-ye Gharbi, Howmeh-ye Sharqi, and Soltanabad Rural District.

References 

Ramhormoz County
Districts of Khuzestan Province